SRTP may refer to:

 Secure Real-time Transport Protocol, security profile for Real-time Transport Protocol
 Service Request Transport Protocol, GE-Fanuc automation protocol for programmable logic controller
 Safe Return to Port requirement, SOLAS requirement to be able to return to port without ship evacuation

See also
 ZRTP, a cryptographic key-agreement protocol using Secure Real-time Transport Protocol for encryption